The National Herald is an English-language weekly newspaper, based in New York City, focusing on the Greek-American community. It was founded in 1997 and added a website in 2004. Its headquarters are in the Long Island City neighborhood of the borough of Queens.

Published by Antonis H. Diamataris, it is a sister publication of the Greek-language American newspaper Ethnikos Kyrix, founded in 1915.

References

Weekly newspapers published in the United States
Greek-American mass media
Newspapers established in 1997
1997 establishments in New York City